is a major railway station in Nakamura-ku, Nagoya, Japan. It is Japan's, and one of the world's, largest train stations by floor area (410,000 m2), and houses the headquarters of the Central Japan Railway Company (JR Central). Much of this space is located in the JR Central Towers atop the station, as well as in underground concourses. The current station complex was completed on December 20, 1999. The station and the area around it is officially called  in the Japanese addressing system.

The station is adjacent to Meitetsu Nagoya Station, the terminal of Meitetsu, and Kintetsu Nagoya Station, the terminal of the Kintetsu Nagoya Line.

The twin-towered station rises over 50 storeys, and is the tallest railway-station building in the world.

Lines

JR Central
 (for Shin-Yokohama, Tokyo, Kyoto, and Shin-Osaka)
 (for Kozoji, Tajimi, and Nakatsugawa)
 (for Yokkaichi, Tsu, and Kameyama)

Aonami Line
Aonami Line (AN01) (for Kinjo-Futo Nagoya International Exhibition Hall)

Nagoya Subway
 (H08)
 (S02)

Station layout

JR Central

The platforms and the tracks are elevated. Six island platforms for the Tōkaidō Main Line, Chuo Line, and Kansai Line are situated in the eastern part of the station (the side where JR Central Towers are situated) and serve 12 tracks. Two island platforms for the Tokaido Shinkansen are situated in the western part and serve four tracks.

Adjacent stations

Aonami Line

The station is situated in the west of the JR Central Lines, on the Inazawa Line. The station has an island platform serving two tracks with platform gates.

Adjacent stations

Nagoya Municipal Subway

An island platform for the Sakura-dori Line serving two tracks is located east to west under the central concourse of JR Nagoya Station. The platform is fenced with platform gates.

An island platform for the Higashiyama Line serving two tracks is located south to north under underground city Meieki Chikagai (Meichika), in the east of JR Nagoya Station.  The southern part of the platform is used for the trains for Fujigaoka and the northern one is for the trains for Takahata.

Adjacent stations

History
Nagoya Station first opened on 1 May 1886.

Station numbering was introduced to the sections of the Chuo, Kansai, and Tōkaidō Main Lines operated JR Central in March 2018; Nagoya Station was assigned station number CF00 for the Chuo Line, CJ00 for the Kansai Main Line, and CA68 for the Tōkaidō Main Line.

Surrounding area
Meitetsu Nagoya Station (Nagoya Railroad)
Kintetsu Nagoya Station (Kintetsu Railway)
Midland Square (ミッドランドスクエア)
JR Gate Tower (JRゲートタワー)

References

External links

JR Central station information 
Station Nagoya 
Towers Nagoya 

Railway stations in Japan opened in 1999
Railway stations in Nagoya
Sasashima-chō